Torunn Janbu (born 26 November 1954) is a Norwegian physician. The president of the Norwegian Medical Association, she became the first female president in the history of the organization upon election in 2005. She attained her cand.med. degree at the University of Oslo in 1979.

Personal life
She is married to politician and physician Kjell Maartmann-Moe.

References

External links
 Press release accompanying her election

1954 births
Living people
Norwegian surgeons
Norwegian women physicians
University of Oslo alumni
Date of birth missing (living people)
Place of birth missing (living people)
Oslo University Hospital people